A four-wheel drive vehicle is a four-wheeled vehicle with a drivetrain that allows all four wheels to receive torque from the engine simultaneously.

The term, or 4 wheel drive, may also refer to:
Four Wheel Drive, a vehicle manufacturer
Four-wheel driving, the sport of off-roading

Entertainment
Cupid's Inspiration, a band that earlier performed as 4 Wheel Drive
Four Wheel Drive (album), a 1975 album by Bachman–Turner Overdrive and the album's title track
"Four-Wheel Drive", a 2002 song by John Michael Montgomery from Pictures
"4 Wheel Drive", a 2017 song by Granger Smith from When the Good Guys Win

See also
FWD (disambiguation)